Zion I was an American hip hop project founded by MC and producer Baba Zumbi (real name Stephen Gaines) in Oakland, California. K-Genius and Amp Live were also project members.

Career
Originally formed as a group, Zion I released the debut studio album, Mind over Matter, in 2000. It was nominated for "Independent Album of the Year" by The Source. Deep Water Slang V2.0 was released in 2003.

In 2005, Zion I released True & Livin'. It featured guest appearances from Gift of Gab, Talib Kweli, and Aesop Rock.

Heroes in the City of Dope, the first collaborative album with The Grouch, was released in 2006. In 2009, Zion I released The Takeover.

In 2010, Zion I released Atomic Clock. Heroes in the Healing of the Nation, the second collaborative studio album with The Grouch, was released in 2011. In 2012, Zion I released Shadowboxing, which was included on SF Weeklys "10 Best Bay Area Hip-Hop Records of 2012" list.

In 2015, Amp Live left the group, and Zion I became Baba Zumbi's one-man project.

In 2016, Zion I released The Labyrinth, their first studio album not to include Amp Live.

On August 13, 2021, Zumbi died at the age of 49 of unknown causes after being hospitalized with COVID-19. On August 20, 2021, the Gaines family announced that they hired attorneys to investigate what they believed was a suspicious death at Alta Bates Summit Medical Center.

Members
 Baba Zumbi – rapper (1996–2021)
 K-Genius – DJ (2000–2002)
 Amp Live – producer, DJ (1996–2015)

Discography

Studio albums
 Mind over Matter (2000)
 Deep Water Slang V2.0 (2003)
 True & Livin' (2005)
 Break a Dawn (2006)
 Heroes in the City of Dope (2006) 
 The Takeover (2009)
 Atomic Clock (2010)
 Heroes in the Healing of the Nation (2011) 
 Shadowboxing (2012)
 The Labyrinth (2016)
Stay Woke (2016) (with Mikos Da Gawd)
 The Tonite Show with Zion I (2018) 
 Ritual Mystik (2018)

Compilation albums
 Curb Servin': The Mixtape Sessions (2003)
 Politicks: Collabs & B-Sides (2004)
 Family Business (2004)
The Alpha:1996-2006 (2006)
Science of Breath (2006)
 Street Legends (2007)
 The Search & The Seizure (2008)
 Bringers of the Dawn (2009)
 Zion I Sampler (2010)
 Live at KEXP Vol. 5 (2009)
 Hella Fresh Fest (2013)
 The Rapture: Live from Oaklandia (2015)
 Street Legends Volume 2 (2017)

EPs
 Enter the Woods (1997)
 New Dimensions (1998)
 Starship (1998)
 Chapter 4 (1999)
 The Vapors (2013)
 The Masters of Ceremony (2014)
 Libations (2014)
 The Sun Moon and Stars (2015)
 Wake Up (2017)

Singles
 "Inner Light" (1998)
 "Critical" b/w "Venus" (1999)
 "Revolution (B-Boy Anthem)" (2000)
 "Boom Bip" b/w "Le Le Le" (2001)
 "Cheeba Cheeba" b/w "Kharma" (2002)
 "The Drill" b/w "Flow" (2003)
 "Salt in the Game" b/w "Break Rap" (2005)
 "Bird's Eye View" b/w "Luv" (2005)
 "Temperature" b/w "The Bay" (2005)
 "Act Right" b/w "Target Practice" (2006)
 "One" b/w "Trippin" (2006)
 "Hit 'Em" (2006) 
 "Lift Me Up" (2007) 
 "Count It Down (Nomak Remix)" (2007)
 "Juicy Juice" (2008)
 "We Don't Wife 'Em" (2016)
 "Saving Souls" (2016)
 "Peace" (2017) 
"End Times" (2020)
"2 Eyes" (2021)
"Stay Focused" (2021)

Guest appearances
 Linkin Park - "Plc.4 Mie Haed" from Reanimation (2002)
 The Planets - "Can't Stop" from The Opening (2002)
 Triple Threat - "Hit 'Em Off" from Many Styles (2003)
 Goapele - "The Daze" from Even Closer (2004)
 Relic - "Trust Yourself" from Note to Self (2004)
 Rico Pabón - "Pa 'Fuera" from Louder Than Fiction (2006)
 Ty - "Oh!" from Closer (2006)
 DJ Deckstream - "Spread Love" from Soundtracks (2007)
 Omina - "Keep Move'n" from Bust (2007)
 Crown City Rockers - "B-Boy (Remix)" (2007)
 Guru - "For Ya Mind" from Guru's Jazzmatazz: Back to the Future (2008)
 Ise Lyfe - "Thigh Bone" from Prince Cometh (2008)
 CLP - "Rockin' Wiz Us" from Supercontinental (2008)
 The Jacka - "Dream" from Tear Gas (2009)
 Jern Eye - "Get Right" from Vision (2009)
 Webcam Hi-Fi - "Promised Land" from Livity Is My Temple (2009)
 Bicasso - "Party Metroid" from Rebel Musiq (2009)
 Pro the Leader & Dopestyle - "Back Wit a Vengence" from Hip Hop Depression (2010)
 Rebelution - "Safe and Sound Remix" from Remix EP (2011)
 Minnesota - "Float" from Altered States LP (2012)
 Latyrx - "It's Time" from The Second Album (2013)
 Matisyahu - "Built to Survive" from Akeda (2014)
 Bassnectar - "Lost in the Crowd" from Noise vs. Beauty (2014)
 Unified Highway - "Same Thing Coming" from Unified Highway (2016)
 Bassnectar - "The Antidote" from All Colors'' (2020)

References

External links
 
 

1996 establishments in California
2021 disestablishments in California
Hip hop groups from California
Rappers from Oakland, California
Musical groups from Oakland, California
African-American musical groups
Alternative hip hop groups